Dom Qaleh (also Romanized as Dom Qalʿeh) is a village in Kuhdasht-e Shomali Rural District, in the Central District of Kuhdasht County, Lorestan Province, Iran. At the 2006 census, its population was 50, in 9 families.

References 

Towns and villages in Kuhdasht County